A lipoblast is a precursor cell for an adipocyte.

Alternate terms include adipoblast and preadipocyte.

Early stages are almost indistinguishable from fibroblasts.

Liposarcoma
Lipoblasts are seen in liposarcoma and characteristically have abundant multivacuolated clear cytoplasm and a dark staining (hyperchromatic), indented nucleus.

See also 

 Adipogenesis
 Adipose differentiation-related protein
 Lipoblastoma

List of human cell types derived from the germ layers

References 

Cell biology